McAbee is a surname. Notable people with the surname include:

Cory McAbee (born 1961), American writer, director, singer, and songwriter
Palmer McAbee (1894–1970), American blues harmonica player

See also
McAbee Fossil Beds
McAfee (surname)